Qaqan (also Romanized as Qāqān; also known as Borj Qāqān) is a village in Kuhsar Rural District, in the Central District of Shazand County, Markazi Province, Iran. At the 2006 census, its population was 478, in 108 families.

References 

Populated places in Shazand County